Bianca Stuart (born May 17, 1988 in Nassau, Bahamas) is a Bahamian long jumper and national record holder with a 6.81 m jump in 2011.

Achievements

References

1988 births
Living people
Bahamian female long jumpers
Sportspeople from Nassau, Bahamas
Athletes (track and field) at the 2012 Summer Olympics
Athletes (track and field) at the 2016 Summer Olympics
Olympic athletes of the Bahamas
Athletes (track and field) at the 2014 Commonwealth Games
Athletes (track and field) at the 2018 Commonwealth Games
Commonwealth Games competitors for the Bahamas
Athletes (track and field) at the 2015 Pan American Games
Pan American Games silver medalists for the Bahamas
World Athletics Championships athletes for the Bahamas
Pan American Games medalists in athletics (track and field)
Central American and Caribbean Games bronze medalists for the Bahamas
Competitors at the 2010 Central American and Caribbean Games
Central American and Caribbean Games medalists in athletics
Medalists at the 2015 Pan American Games